The Chinese Ambassador to Slovakia is the official representative of the People's Republic of China to Slovakia.

List of representatives

See also

Slovakia–Taiwan relations

References 

Ambassadors of China to Slovakia
Slovakia
China